The Men's 10 km competition of the 2014 European Aquatics Championships was held on 14 August.

Results
The race was started at 10:00.

References

2014 European Aquatics Championships
European Aquatics Championships